Sherwood Convent School was started in the year 1993 by Late Sqn Ldr M. L. Malik. It is a co-educational, English-medium senior secondary school located at Plot No.-2102, L 14, DLF Phase – II,  Gurgaon, Haryana, India. The medium of instruction is in English and it is affiliated to Central Board of Secondary Education, New Delhi & follows CCE (Continuous and Comprehensive Evaluation) core curriculum.

Facilities
School provides following facilities :
 Air conditioned class rooms
 Multimedia smart boards
 CCTV surveillance
 Library
 Well equipped laboratories
 Air-conditioned computer labs
 GPS enabled fleet of buses with CCTV Camera, Male conductor and a Lady attendant

Academic
The school has classes offered from Nursery to 12th class. The school is completely English-medium and is affiliated to Central Board of Secondary Education. Academic facilities includes classrooms and laboratories which are equipped with interactive whiteboards, projection screens.

Activities
The school campus hosts well ventilated classrooms, a well stocked library, well equipped labs for physics, chemistry and biology, an auditorium, an activity area and an infirmary. The sports infrastructure includes basketball court, football field, volleyball court, indoor games room, splash pool and a vast playground. The school follows a traditional British school house system. The school consists of four houses:
 Encounter
 Endurance
 Endeavour
 Enterprise

See also
Education in India
Literacy in India
List of institutions of higher education in Haryana

References

External links
 Sherwood Convent School – Official Website

Schools in Gurgaon
Schools in Haryana
Private schools in Haryana
Primary schools in India
High schools and secondary schools in Haryana